Maddilapalem Bus Station is a bus station located at the Central part of Visakhapatnam city. The bus station is owned by Andhra Pradesh State Road Transport Corporation (APSRTC). This is one of the minor bus stations in Andhra Pradesh. Many buses from other states like Odissa, Chhattisgarh and Telangana arrive at the station. Buses provide their services to all the towns nearby and also within the city as well. It is mainly used as city bus terminus.

City buses

Numerous city busses operates from here to Bus Station Complex and Railway station and every part of the city.

See also
 Dwaraka Bus station Complex

References

Bus stations in Visakhapatnam